Monteoru House is a historic house and monument in Bucharest, Romania.

Monteoru House was built in 1874. It is located on  Victory Avenue (Calea Victoriei), one of the main arteries of downtown Bucharest. It is classified as a historical monument of national interest, under the number B-II-mA-19863. Between 1949 and 2013 it was the headquarters of the Union of Writers of Romania (Uniunea Scriitorilor din Romania). That year, by court order, the building was returned to the heirs of the family who owned it before it was nationalized.

In 2015, the owners declared their intention to transform the palace into a multicultural center. In the same year, a restaurant was opened in the garden and the palace was planned to be used for live music shows, exhibitions, fairs, events for children, and other entertainment activities.

References

External links

Houses completed in 1874